Shanxi Television (SXTV), is a television network in the Taiyuan and Shanxi province. It was founded and started to broadcast in November 2004. SXTV currently broadcasts in Jin Chinese.

External links
Official Site 

Television networks in China
Television channels and stations established in 2004
Taiyuan